Pediatric Critical Care Medicine is a peer-reviewed medical journal that covers intensive care treatment of children and newborns. It is the official journal of the Society of Critical Care Medicine, the World Federation of Pediatric Intensive and Critical Care Societies, the Pediatric Intensive Care Society, the Latin American Society of Pediatric Intensive Care, and the Japanese Society of Pediatric Intensive and Critical Care. It was established in 2000 and is published 12 times a year by Lippincott Williams & Wilkins. The editor-in-chief is Robert C. Tasker (Boston Children's Hospital). The journal is published in Chinese, English with selected abstracts translated into Chinese, French, Italian, Japanese, Portuguese, and Spanish.

Abstracting and indexing 
The journal is abstracted and indexed in:

According to the Journal Citation Reports, the journal has a 2013 impact factor of 2.326, ranking it 15th out of 27 journals in the category "Critical Care Medicine" and 26th out of 117 journals in the category "Pediatrics".

Notes

References

External links 

Society of Critical Care Medicine
World Federation of Pediatric Intensive and Critical Care Societies
Pediatric Intensive Care Society (UK)
Latin American Society of Pediatric Intensive Care 
Japanese Society of Pediatric Intensive and Critical Care 

Lippincott Williams & Wilkins academic journals
Pediatrics journals
Emergency medicine journals
English-language journals
Publications established in 2000
9 times per year journals